"Doll Parts" is a song by American alternative rock band Hole, written by vocalist and rhythm guitarist Courtney Love. The song was released as the band's sixth single and second from their second studio album, Live Through This, in November 1994 to accompany the band's North American tour. It was also the first single to be released following the death of bassist Kristen Pfaff in June 1994.

Courtney Love wrote the song in the fall of 1991 soon after she met Kurt Cobain, and has admitted that its lyrics were about her insecurity of his romantic interest in her. It became one of the band's most popular songs, peaking on the US Billboard Modern Rock Tracks at number 4, and is considered by fans and critics alike as one of Hole's signature tracks.

In September 2021, Rolling Stone ranked the track 208 in their list of the 500 Greatest Songs of All Time.

Background and recording 
Courtney Love is known to have written "Doll Parts" as early as November 1991, performing it acoustically at a Hole concert in Massachusetts. The song developed into its final form less than two weeks later and became a regular number on setlists during the band's tour of Europe and the United Kingdom the following month. Journalist Everett True also noted that Love performed an acoustic version of the song to him over a telephone at 4 a.m. during the band's tour.

The first known studio version of "Doll Parts" was recorded on November 19, 1991 at Maida Vale Studios as part of Hole's first radio session with BBC DJ John Peel. A second version of the song was recorded on March 27, 1993 with Mark Goodier, another BBC radio host, during a short three-date tour of England. In October 1993, the band recorded the album version of the song as part of the Live Through This sessions at Triclops Studios in Atlanta, Georgia.

Composition 
"Doll Parts" thematically focuses on themes of love, rejection, and fear of unrequited romance. Speaking to Uncut magazine in 2010, Love stated that the song was specifically about Kurt Cobain, who she thought "didn't like [her]." Love divulged that she wrote the song while staying at the Cambridge, Massachusetts apartment of Joyce Linehan, a music executive, and that she had written most of it while locked in a bathroom. Love has said that the line "dog beg" was worked into the first verse because there was literally a dog in the apartment begging for food.

 
Both the title of the song and the lyrical meaning are inspired by an encounter Love had with Kurt Cobain in 1991 prior to their relationship and marriage. Love had sent Cobain "a heart-shaped box scented with perfume and inside a porcelain doll, three dried roses, a miniature teacup and shellac-covered seashells" to apologize for their first meeting in May 1991, where Love infamously wrestled with Cobain. The box, purchased in an antique store in New Orleans, was later the influence for the Cobain-penned Nirvana song, "Heart-Shaped Box." The lyrics reflect Love's initial feelings about Cobain having felt rejected by his lack of communication, which is most acutely conveyed in the line: "he only loves those things because he loves to see them break."

After Cobain's death in April 1994, "Doll Parts" took on a more tragic meaning with Love giving anguished performances of the song on tour. Drummer Patty Schemel has said that "certain things would remind her, a lot of the time on-stage, and it would just come out. Certain lyrics had a lot more meaning."

Musically, the song is composed of only three chords: A, Cmaj7, and G. In retrospect, Love noted the song's musical simplicity— "I still don't understand why that one song with just three chords is such a big thing, but it's definitely got some good lyrics." On both Live Through This and the individual single, the song is credited on record as written by Hole as a band, however according to BMI's website, the official author is solely Courtney Love.

Release 
"Doll Parts" was released on November 15, 1994 in the United States as the second single from Hole's second studio album, Live Through This (1994). It was released as a CD single, cassette and 7" on DGC Records, with alternate tracklistings for each pressing. Upon its release in Europe, three CD singles were released on DGC, Geffen Records and City Slang, with additional live recordings.

The song became Hole's highest-charting song in the United States, peaking at #39 on the Billboard Hot 100 Airplay. "Doll Parts" peaked at number 4 on the Billboard Modern Rock Tracks chart in December 1994 and at number 58 on the Billboard Hot 100 in January 1995. The song later charted on Canada's RPM Singles Chart, the UK Singles Chart, Belgian Singles Chart in Wallonia and the French Singles Chart.

Music video 

The music video for "Doll Parts" was directed by Samuel Bayer—who had also directed music videos for The Smashing Pumpkins and Nirvana—and who Hole commissioned following the death of bassist Kristen Pfaff. Jennifer Finch of L7 is featured as the bassist in the video. Bayer has said that he wanted it "evoke the feeling of death" and used ideas conceived by Courtney Love throughout the video.

Love's ideas included a large amount of doll imagery, herself "in a babydoll dress looking demure while playing guitar on a bed" and "walking in a bleak backyard passing a children's table set for a tea party." Bayer designed the garden scenes to be "decaying" and added "a hundred plaster-wrapped dolls dangling from trees." Other scenes features a young blonde boy, a reference "meant to invoke Kurt [Cobain]", and footage of the band performing the song. Most of the video was shot in black-and-white and interspersed with various color shots. Two edits of "Doll Parts" have been broadcast—an original edit and a "producer's version."

The video for "Doll Parts" was nominated for Best Alternative Video at the 1995 MTV Video Music Awards but lost to "Buddy Holly" by Weezer.

Cover versions
English trip hop artist Tricky covered the song on his 2017 album Ununiform under the title "Doll", featuring Avalon Lurks. The band Eyes Set To Kill covered the song on their album White Lotus.

Miley Cyrus covered the song live on the Howard Stern Show in December 2020 to widespread acclaim. Love praised the cover as a "sweet version", and said she was "touched" by the gesture.

American alternative metal artist God Analog released a cover of the song as a single in January 2023, featuring drummer Nik Hughes, with mastering done by Machine.

Track listing 
All songs written by Courtney Love, except where noted.

US 7" single (DGCS7-19379)
"Doll Parts"3:31
"Plump"  (Love, Eric Erlandson)2:42

UK 7" single (GFS 91)
"Doll Parts"3:31
"The Void" (Ana da Silva, Gina Birch)2:57

UK CD single (GFSTD 91)
"Doll Parts"3:31
"The Void" (Da Silva, Birch)2:57
"Hungry Like the Wolf"  (Simon Le Bon, Nick Rhodes, John Taylor)1:42

UK CD single (GFSXD 91)
"Doll Parts" (Love) – 3:31
"Plump"  (Love, Erlandson)2:42
"I Think That I Would Die"  (Love, Erlandson, Kat Bjelland)4:22
"Credit in the Straight World"  (Stuart Moxham)2:49

Credits and personnel 
All personnel credits adapted from Live Through Thiss liner notes.

Hole
 Courtney Love –  vocals, guitar
 Eric Erlandson – guitar
 Kristen Pfaff – bass, piano, backing vocals
 Patty Schemel – drums, percussion

Production
 Paul Q. Kolderie – producer, engineer
 Sean Slade – producer, engineer
 Scott Litt – mixing

Charts

Notes

References

Sources

External links 
 
 

1994 singles
Hole (band) songs
Songs written by Courtney Love
Songs about musicians
Music videos directed by Samuel Bayer
Cultural depictions of Kurt Cobain
1994 songs
DGC Records singles